Gravelle Craig (born June 10, 1970) is a college basketball coach, last serving as an assistant at Stetson University in DeLand, Florida. From 2011 to 2017, Craig was the head coach for the Bethune-Cookman University men's basketball team. He is a former college basketball player and former associate coach for Bethune-Cookman.

Head coaching career
The Bethune-Cookman Wildcats won four out of their first fifteen games, a 4–11 start. Bethune-Cookman's strong showing in the next twenty games gave Craig an 18–17 mark for his first season. This would be the fourth consecutive winning season for the Wildcats. Craig was fired on March 20, 2017, after six seasons and a record of 74–123.

Associate coach
Craig started serving as assistant coach 2004, serving most recently as an associate head coach before being named head coach in 2011. As associate head coach, his roles were to oversee the development of the Wildcats' backcourt players, recruit and scout future players and monitor the player's academics

On September 21, 2018, it was announced Craig would become an assistant at Stetson under head coach Corey Williams.

Personal life
Craig is a graduate of Cleveland State University. He currently resides in Daytona Beach, Florida.

Head coaching record

References

1970 births
Living people
Basketball coaches from Pennsylvania
Basketball players from Pennsylvania
Bethune–Cookman Wildcats men's basketball coaches
Chicago State Cougars men's basketball coaches
College men's basketball head coaches in the United States
Cleveland State Vikings men's basketball players